The 2019 Women's East Asia Cup was a Women's Twenty20 International (WT20I) cricket tournament, which was held in South Korea in September 2019. All of the matches were played at the Yeonhui Cricket Ground in  Incheon, where a round-robin series was followed by a final and a third-place play-off.

The Twenty20 East Asia Cup is an annual competition featuring China, Hong Kong, Japan and South Korea that was first played in 2015 and alternates annually between a men's and women's event. The women's event was won by China in 2015 and by Hong Kong in 2017. The men's events in 2016 and 2018 (both featuring the Hong Kong Dragons – a side representing Hong Kong's Chinese community – instead of their senior national team) had been won by South Korea and Japan, respectively. The 2019 edition was the first to be granted official T20I status after the International Cricket Council (ICC) had granted T20I status to matches between all of its members from 1 July 2018 (women's teams) and 1 January 2019 (men's teams).

China defeated Hong Kong in the final by 14 runs to claim the title.

Squads

Round-robin

Points table

Matches

Play-offs

Third-place play-off

Final

References

External links
 Series home at ESPN Cricinfo

Associate international cricket competitions in 2019–20
Women's Twenty East Asia Cup
2019 Women's Twenty20 East Asia Cup